Earlington Carl Tilghman, known as Sonny Til (August 18, 1928 – December 9, 1981), was an American singer. He was the lead singer of The Orioles, a vocal group from Baltimore, Maryland, inducted into the Rock and Roll Hall of Fame in 1995.

By 1960 Til was the only original member left.  He led the Orioles from its establishment until his death in 1981 of heart failure, complicated by diabetes.

Discography

With the Orioles
 Today (Dobre Records DR1016, 1978)
 "Old Gold / New Gold" (RCA LSP-4538, 1971)

With Band
 Back to the Chapel (Dobre Records DR1026, 1978)

References

Jubilee Records artists
Vee-Jay Records artists
Apex Records artists
1928 births
1981 deaths
20th-century American singers